Simon Vallily (born 15 August 1985) is an English professional boxer. As an amateur, he was a member of the England elite squad as well as the Great British podium squad and won gold at the 2010 Commonwealth Games in Delhi. Vallily was born to English father and Jamaican mother.

Amateur career
Fighting for the South Bank Amateur boxing club in Middlesbrough, Vallily was formerly on the books of Middlesbrough Football Club until disciplinary issues meant that his career in football ended prematurely.  Vallily claimed that he started boxing after getting into trouble when he was a kid, and that what he would be doing if he were not boxing would be "not worth thinking about".

In February 2006, he was sentenced to 4 years in prison following a knife attack. Halfway into his sentence he was released and started to concentrate on his boxing career.

Domestic honours
In 2009, competing in the super heavyweight division, Vallily won the senior ABA title in Sheffield at the English Institute of Sport, beating Amin Isa 13-4.  Despite touching the canvas himself, the victory included a knockdown of his opponent in the third round.

Speaking of the win and of the fact that he himself had taken a count, Vallily said, "Getting caught gave me a kick up the backside and got me going".  Reflecting on the turnaround in his life since being sentenced to jail in 2006 Vallily said, "I've changed since those days and I'm an ABA champion now...All that is behind me and I don't like to look back - I was just a daft kid...I want to look to the future. I'm grown up now and more focused and this is just the start".  On 13 November 2010, Vallily was crowned the Great Britain champion after defeating experienced rival Danny Price 4-3 in the tournament held in Liverpool's Echo Arena and televised by the BBC.

Commonwealth Games
Vallily was part of the England team that competed at the 2010 Commonwealth Games in Delhi.  Picked at the 91kg Heavyweight category, Vallily fought his way to the final, defeating Dominic Winrow of the Isle of Man in the first round, Arsene Foukou of Cameroon in the quarter-finals and gaining a walkover against Awusone Yekeni of Ghana in the semifinals.

In the final he claimed the gold medal with a first round stoppage over Northern Ireland's Steven Ward after knocking him to the canvas, having quickly established a 6-1 lead.  Speaking of Vallily's performance, coach Rob McCracken said "He's frighteningly good. We've got two years to work with him and there's a real possibility he could win the Olympics".

Professional boxing record

Exhibition boxing record

References

External links
 

1985 births
Living people
English male boxers
Cruiserweight boxers
Boxers at the 2010 Commonwealth Games
Commonwealth Games gold medallists for England
England Boxing champions
Sportspeople from Middlesbrough
Commonwealth Games medallists in boxing
Medallists at the 2010 Commonwealth Games